Walter Pradt (12 April 1949 – 24 August 2014) was a German football player and manager.

External links

1949 births
2014 deaths
Sportspeople from Wiesbaden
German footballers
Association football goalkeepers
SV Waldhof Mannheim players
1. FC Nürnberg players
SpVgg Bayreuth players
German football managers
SV Waldhof Mannheim managers
Footballers from Hesse